Hafiz Ringim was a Nigerian Policeman and former Inspector General of Police. He was appointed in 2010 to succeed Ogbonna Okechukwu Onovo and was succeeded by Mohammed Dikko Abubakar in 2012.

References

Nigerian police chiefs
Living people
Year of birth missing (living people)
People from Jigawa State